Paul François Robert Azaïs (6 May 1902 – 17 November 1974) was a French film actor. He appeared in more than 110 films between 1929 and 1966.

Selected filmography

 The Three Masks (1929) - Le fils Vescotelli
 Le défenseur (1930)
 Paris la nuit (1930) - Bouledebois
 Montmartre (1931) - Un client de Dédé (uncredited)
 Plein la vue (1931)
 Wooden Crosses (1932) - Soldat Broucke
 Fantômas (1932) - Giroud, le mécanicien de Lord Beltham
 The Miracle Child (1932) - Ratier
 The Yellow Dog (1932) - Le marin
 L'agence O-Kay (1932) - Kokanase
 Fun in the Barracks (1932) - Croquebol
 Maquillage (1932)
 En plein dans le mille (1932) - Le gigolo
 La poule (1933) - Pascal
 The Star of Valencia (1933) - Un joueur du Trocadéro
 Pour être aimé (1933)
 Cette vieille canaille (1933) - Jacques
 Les bleus du ciel (1933)
 The Agony of the Eagles (1933) - Le policier
 Street Without a Name (1934) - Manu
 Les Misérables (1934) - Grantaire
 L'ange gardien (1934) - Fred
 The Concierge's Daughters (1934) - Albert
 Adémaï aviateur (1934) - L'Adjudant
 Sidonie Panache (1934) - Bourrache
 Cessez le feu (1934) - Tutule
 Pension Mimosas (1935) - Carlo
 Roi de Camargue (1935) - Titin
 The Devil in the Bottle (1935) - Lopaka
 La rosière des Halles (1935) - Raphaël
 Amants et voleurs (1935) - Valtier
 Divine (1935) - Victor
 Le bébé de l'escadron (1935) - Fouillard, le soldat au coeur tendre
 La marmaille (1935) - Pinpin
 Haut comme trois pommes (1936)
 Anne-Marie (1936) - Le boxeur
 Coup de vent (1936) - Pierre
 Moutonnet (1936) - Le garçon d'étage
 A Legionnaire (1936) - Turlot
 Au son des guitares (1936) - Pierrot
 Girls of Paris (1936) - Henri Maubert
 Nitchevo (1936) - Lemoule, un matelot
 Les petites alliées (1936) - Justin
 Gigolette (1937) - Charles
 Trois artilleurs au pensionnat (1937) - L;épicier
 Franco de port (1937) - Fernando
 Passeurs d'hommes (1937) - Arsène
 La femme du bout du monde (1938) - Radio Molinier
 Trois dans un moulin (1938)
 Storm Over Asia (1938) - Jonny le pianiste
 Trois artilleurs en vadrouille (1938) - Le charcutier Plume
 S.O.S. Sahara (1938) - Bobby
 Les rois de la flotte (1938)
 Three Artillerymen at the Opera (1938) - Billardon
 Frères corses (1939) - André, le mauvais garçon
 Deuxième bureau contre kommandantur (1939) - Stiefel
 There's No Tomorrow (1939) - Henri
 Frères d'Afrique (1939)
 Narcisse (1940) - Crépin
 Hangman's Noose (1940) - Dollboys
 Camp Thirteen (1940) - Jean-Pierre
 Patrouille blanche (1942) - Victor
 Forte tête (1942) - Alexandre
 À la Belle frégate (1943) - Félix
 Ne le criez pas sur les toits (1943) - P'tit Louis
 Mon amour est près de toi (1943) - Le Frisé
 Adrien (1943) - Jules Petitpas
 Bifur 3 (1945) - André
 Destins (1946)
 Rooster Heart (1946) - Serapain
 Chinese Quarter (1947) - Toni
 Mandrin (1947) - Trognard
 Si jeunesse savait... (1948) - Paulo
 Night Express (1948) - Un inspecteur
 Fantomas Against Fantomas (1949) - Martin
 Marlene (1949) - Le barman
 I Like Only You (1949) - Le compositeur
 Return to Life (1949) - Le capitaine (segment 4 : "Le retour de René") (uncredited)
 At the Grand Balcony (1949) - Morel
 Drame au Vel'd'Hiv''' (1949) - Un inspecteur
 Amédée (1950) - Le photographe
 Au p'tit zouave (1950) - Adolphe
 Tuesday's Guest (1950)
 The King of the Bla Bla Bla (1950) - Bébert
 Maria of the End of the World (1951) - Le vieil homme
 Les petites Cardinal (1951) - Le régisseur
 The Night Is My Kingdom (1951) - Loustaud
 Duel in Dakar (1951) - Marco
 Monsieur Octave (1951)
 Le costaud des Batignolles (1952) - Le patron du Mala-bar (uncredited)
 Le Plaisir (1952) - Le patron du bal (segment "Le Masque")
 Casque d'Or (1952) - Ponsard
 The Seven Deadly Sins (1952) - Le patron du restaurant (segment "Paresse, La / Sloth") (uncredited)
 Monsieur Taxi (1952) - Henri - le barman
 Double or Quits (1953) - Tonio
 Les amours finissent à l'aube (1953) - Lulu
 La môme vert-de-gris (1953) - Le patron du bistrot
 The Earrings of Madame de… (1953) - Le premier cocher
 Children of Love (1953) - M. Lefranc
 Minuit... Champs-Elysées (1954)
 Tempest in the Flesh (1954) - Le garagiste
 Royal Affairs in Versailles (1954) - Un révolutionnaire (uncredited)
 Les révoltés de Lomanach (1954) - Un garde
 Les Intrigantes (1954) - Le Brancardier
 Tourments (1954) - Le père Bizule, gardien de chantier
 The Women Couldn't Care Less (1954) - Guard at the Pier
 The Lovers of Marianne (1954)
 Opération tonnerre (1954)
 Sur le banc (1954) - Lacassagne
 The Infiltrator (1955) - Dominique - le 'Corse'
 Razzia sur la chnouf (1955) - Le patron du bistrot
 L'impossible Monsieur Pipelet (1955) - Le patron du bistrot (uncredited)
 Je suis un sentimental (1955) - Un inspecteur (uncredited)
 Law of the Streets (1955)
 Diary of a Bad Girl (1956) - Un joueur de poker
 Blood to the Head (1956) - Alphonse, le patron des 'Charentes'
 Les carottes sont cuites (1956)
 Bonjour Toubib (1957)
 Sénéchal the Magnificent (1957) - Le garagiste - mécanicien du car
 Miss Pigalle (1958)
 Tendre et violente Elisabeth'' (1960) - Le patron de la guinguette

References

External links

1902 births
1974 deaths
French male film actors
Male actors from Paris
20th-century French male actors